A slick magazine is a magazine printed on high-quality glossy paper.  The term may have come into use in the 1930s, and was used to distinguish these magazines from pulp magazines, which were printed on cheap, rough paper.  The slicks also attempted to appeal to a more elite audience.  Examples of magazines regarded as slicks include Vanity Fair, Saturday Evening Post, Better Homes and Gardens, and Harper's.

Notes

References 
 

Magazine publishing